Feine Sahne Fischfilet ("Fine Cream Fish Fillet") is a German punk band formed in 2007 in Mecklenburg-Vorpommern. The band's members are from Jarmen, Greifswald, Rostock, Demmin, Loitz, Hanshagen and Wismar.

The band has officially released five studio albums: Backstage mit Freunden in 2009 and Wut im Bauch, Trauer im Herzen a year later — both released via Diffidati Records —, Scheitern & Verstehen in 2012, Bleiben oder Gehen in 2015 and Sturm & Dreck in 2018 via Audiolith Records. The 2015 released fourth studio album peaked at no. 21 in the German Albums Charts. Sturm & Dreck reached no. 3 in German Albums Charts, no. 12 in the Austrian Albums Charts and no. 30 in the Swiss Albums Charts.

In 2009 the Landeskriminalamt Mecklenburg-Vorpommern filed a lawsuit against the band because of the song Staatsgewalt ("Authority of the State") which is on the tracklist on their debut record Backstage mit Freunden at the Bundesprüfstelle für jugendgefährdende Medien for potential violent content which got declined later. Two years later the band was mentioned in the Verfassungsschutzbericht of Mecklenburg-Vorpommern for having an explicit anti-state attitude. The band was featured in the Verfassungsschutzbericht again a year later.

Feine Sahne Fischfilet played at major music festivals like Rock am Ring and Rock im Park, Hurricane Festival, Southside and Vainstream Rockfest. As a reaction of the protests in Chemnitz the band took part at the free-for-all concert under the moniker #WirSindMehr alongside Die Toten Hosen, Kraftklub, Marteria, Casper and K.I.Z against hate and racism. German president Frank-Walter Steinmeier shared a posting about this concert on his social media and got criticized for supporting left extremists in content of the participation of Feine Sahne Fischfilet.

The band won several prizes like the Preis für Popkultur in 2017 for their campaign Noch nicht komplett im Arsch. Feine Sahne Fischfilet ranked second at the 2013s Courage Prize of the Linksfraktion at the Landtag of Mecklenburg-Vorpommern. Prior to that the band was nominated as Best Newcomer at the VIA! Vut Indie Awards. In 2018 the band was nominated at the Best German Act category at the 2018 MTV Europe Music Awards.

Discography

Accolades

Band members 
Current members
 Kai Irrgang – bass (2004–present)
 Jan ″Monchi″ Gorkow – lead vocals (2006–present)
 Olaf Ney – drums (2008–present)
 Max Bobzin – trumpet, backing vocals (2009–present)
 Hauke – guitar, lead vocals (2022–present)

Former members
 Ahl – drums (2004–2008) 
 Danny – guitar, lead vocals (2004–2009) 
 Tillmann – trumpet (2008–2009)
 Christoph Sell – guitar, lead vocals (2009–2022)
 Jacobus North – trumpet, backing vocals (2010–2022)

Trivia 
 Several members, including vocalist Jan Gorkow are part of the FC Hansa Rostock fan scene.
 The song Ostrava was dedicated to the FC Hansa fan scene; Keine Träne describes the estrangement of the fan scene.
 Vocalist Jan Gorkow had to face a lawsuit because he was accused to be involved in a confrontation with a neo nazi. He was later acquitted by the court.
 Charly Hübner directed the documentary movie Wildes Herz which is about the band.
 In 2017 originally comedian Jan Böhmermann was receiving the VUT Indie Award but he didn't attend the Awards ceremony. Feine Sahne Fischfilet were declared as winner afterwards. Böhmermann and the band's members auctioned the prize on eBay and donated that money to Jugend rettet, an organization which helps rescuing refugees in the Mediterranean Sea.
 Jan Gorkow is involved in the campaign MV for Kobane.
 In October 2016, Jan Gorkow was part of TV show ″Applaus und raus!″ on Pro Sieben moderated by stand-up comedian Oliver Polak.

Notes

External links 

  

German punk rock groups